Santhosh Ananddram is an Indian film lyric writer, screenwriter, director who works in Kannada cinema. He rose to fame with his debut directional venture 2014 film Mr. and Mrs. Ramachari. He later went on and directed Power Star Puneeth Rajkumar in Raajakumara and Yuvarathnaa. Raajakumara was the industry hit in Kannada cinema, until the release of K.G.F: Chapter 1.

Career
He started his film career as a lyric writer through Rocky. He then assisted Harsha in script, dialogues and direction departments for Chingari. He also worked as a dialogue writer for Agraja and Gajakesari. He made his directional debut in 2014 with Industry hit Mr. and Mrs. Ramachari starring Yash (actor) and Radhika Pandit. His next movie Raajakumara with Puneeth Rajkumar was released on 24 March 2017 and received huge applause from critics and audience. After humongous success of Raajakumara and two straight industry hits, he rose to fame as "Star Director" of Kannada cinema.

Ananddram's upcoming film is again with Kannada Star Puneeth Rajkumar titled YuvaRathnaa under Hombale Films. It was launched on 1 November 2018 on account of Kannada Rajyotsava. It was noted that two impaired kids from Chamarajanagar district came down to release the title of the movie. Ananddram was honoured with Zee Kannada's Hemmeya Nirdeshaka (Proud Director of Karnataka) for Raajakumara. He made his Tollywood debut with the film Yuvarathnaa in 2021.

Personal life
Santhosh Ananddram hail from Kota, Udupi district, Karnataka though he was born in and brought up in Bangalore. He has a Brother Sagar Ananddram, who assists him in his Cine Career. He did his schooling (primary & high school) in Bangalore Education Society. He obtained a degree from Seshadripuram college, Bangalore. He was also recruited to Infosys where he worked for close to a year and resigned because of his desire for cinema.

He married Surabhi on 21 February 2018 in Bangalore.

Filmography

Awards

References

External links
 
 Official Facebook Page
 Sandalwood's debutant directors
 Interview with Santhosh

Kannada film directors
People from Udupi district
Singers from Bangalore
Kannada screenwriters
Kannada-language lyricists
Indian male songwriters
Living people
Screenwriters from Bangalore
1985 births
Telugu film directors